Warlord is the second studio album by Swedish rapper Yung Lean. It was released on February 25, 2016, by YEAR0001. It was recorded from the spring to the fall of 2015, across Florida and Stockholm. A deluxe edition was released on April 28, 2016.

Track listing

Critical reception 
Steve Mallon of Crack Magazine wrote that "As with much of Lean’s output, tracks like Fantasy, Highway Patrol and Afghanistan feature crystalline instrumentals, but are let down by uninspired lyricism and stilted delivery" while Ural Garrett of HipHopDX said "Regardless of some unintentional missteps, Warlord explores the mind of a man already turned cynical toward fame, even if it’s only by the binary codes of the web."

Some reviews were far less positive however. Tiny Mix Tapes wrote in a more negative piece that "listening to Warlord is like thinking of Napoleon beating himself up. It’s intentional. But being played a fool and submitting are different topics (wholly); it’s fucking cold up in here. So I see you, Yung Lean. You’re just stoked because you were the first to grab the name Warlord across all gaming platforms. Human beings are liars. All of them."

References

External links
 

2016 albums
Yung Lean albums
Year0001 albums